Today is a mix album made by German electronic music artist Superpitcher. It was released in 2005 on the Kompakt music label.

Track listing
 "Spark" (Lawrence) – 7:24 
 "Let's Help Me" (DJ Koze) – 4:59 
 "Lovefood [Matias Aguayo Mix]" (Michael Mayer) – 5:43 
 "Leuchtturm [Wighnomy's Polarzipper Remix]" (Triola) – 4:41 
 "21:31" (Oliver Hacke) – 7:01 
 "The World Keeps Turning [Highfish & Zander Remix]" (Psychonauts) – 7:49 
 "Dinamo" (Nathan Fake) – 8:21 
 "Wurz und Blosse" (Wighnomy Brothers) – 5:04 
 "Happiness [Lawrence Mix]" (Superpitcher) – 6:46 
 "Old Song" (Max Mohr) – 6:42 
 "La Ritournelle" (Sébastien Tellier) – 7:42

Superpitcher albums
2005 compilation albums
Kompakt compilation albums